Świątki may refer to the following places:
Świątki, Łódź Voivodeship (central Poland)
Świątki, Warmian-Masurian Voivodeship (north Poland)
Świątki, Myślibórz County in West Pomeranian Voivodeship (north-west Poland)
Świątki, Szczecinek County in West Pomeranian Voivodeship (north-west Poland)